= De Caro & Kaplen =

American law firm

De Caro & Kaplen, LLP
- Headquarters: New York, U.S.
- Major practice areas: Brain injury, full-service firm
- Date founded: 1982
- Company type: LLC
- Website: Official website

De Caro & Kaplen, LLP, is a New York-based law firm founded in 1982. The organization is one of the most prominent law firms in the U.S. to specialize in brain injury cases, including representing the Brain Injury Association of America as amicus counsel in opposition to the NFL brain injury class action settlement.

== History ==
The firm was founded by Michael Kaplen and Shana De Caro who have published numerous scholarly works on brain injury law. The firm also specializes in legal advocacy concerning vehicle collisions, construction site accidents, and medical malpractice.

=== Brain Injury Advocacy ===
The firm represented the Brain Injury Association of America as Amicus Counsel in opposing the National Football League class action concussion settlement before the Third Circuit, United States Court of Appeals and the United States Supreme Court. In January 2021, firm partner Shana De Caro was elected as chairwoman of the board of directors of the Brain Injury Association of America. De Caro was re-elected for a second term in January 2022.

=== Brain Injury Identification Card ===
In January 2018, the firm launched a free identification card for brain injury survivors. In March 2023, the firm announced that they had processed applications from over 29,000 individuals.
